Joseph Ruddell  was an Irish Anglican priest: he was Archdeacon of Clogher from 1923 until 1937.

Ruddell was born at Clonroot on 9 November 1866, and educated at the Royal University of Ireland, Trinity College, Dublin and Queen's University Belfast. He was a maths teacher at Rathmines School then  Drogheda Grammar School. He was ordained deacon in 1893 and priest in 1894. After  curacies in Muckno and Clones he was the incumbent at Castle Archdale then Clones.

The Diocese of Clogher awards a prize in his honour.

References

Archdeacons of Clogher
Alumni of Trinity College Dublin
Alumni of the Royal University of Ireland
Alumni of Queen's University Belfast
20th-century Irish Anglican priests
19th-century Irish Anglican priests
People from County Armagh
19th-century Irish educators
People educated at Santry School
1866 births
Year of death missing